Sterkstroom Provincial Hospital is a Provincial government funded hospital for the Inkwanca Local Municipality area in Sterkstroom, Eastern Cape in South Africa.

The hospital departments include Emergency department, Paediatric ward, Maternity ward, Out Patients Department, Surgical Services, Medical Services, Operating Theatre & CSSD Services, Pharmacy, Anti-Retroviral (ARV) treatment for HIV/AIDS, Post Trauma Counseling Services, X-ray Services, Physiotherapy, NHLS Laboratory, Laundry Services, Kitchen Services and Mortuary.

References 
 Eastern Cape Department of Health website - Chris Hani District Hospitals

Hospitals in the Eastern Cape
Enoch Mgijima Local Municipality